Brian N. Ball (19 June 1932 – 23 July 2020) was an English author of speculative fiction, known mainly for his three series Timepiece, Probability Man, and Jackson, as well as numerous standalone novels. In all, he authored some 90 novels. 

Ball attended Chester College from 1953 to 1955, received a BA from London University in 1960, and then an MA from Sheffield University in 1968. His degree was in theology, though he was an atheist.

Ball became a senior lecturer at Dorchester College of Education in 1965, and was a visiting member of the University of British Columbia. His death, in July 2020, was after a long illness.

Select Bibliography

Jackson Series
 Jackson's House (1974)
 Jackson's Friend (1975)
 Jackson's Holiday (1977)
 Jackson and the Magpies (1978)

The Probability Man Series
 The Probability Man (1972)
 Planet Probability (1973)

Timepiece Series
 Timepiece (1968)
 Timepivot (1970)
 Timepit (1971)

Witchfinder Series
 The Mark of the Beast (1971)
 The Evil at Monteine (1977)

Space 1999
 The Space Guardians (1975)
 Survival (2005)

Miscellaneous Novels
 Sundog (1965)
 Lesson for the Damned (1971)
 Devil's Peak (1972)
 The Regiments of Night (1972)
 Singularity Station (1973)
 The Venomous Serpent (1974)
 The Starbuggy (1983)
 The Doomship of Drax (1985)
 Malice of the Soul (2008)

Anthologies
 Tales of Science Fiction (ed) (1964)

Nonfiction
 Young Person's Guide to UFOs (1979)

References

External links

1932 births
2020 deaths
English writers
Writers from Cheshire